The CHL Defenceman of the Year Award is given out annually to the top defenceman in the Canadian Hockey League. It is chosen from the winners of the league trophies, the Max Kaminsky Trophy of the Ontario Hockey League, the Bill Hunter Memorial Trophy of the Western Hockey League, and the Emile Bouchard Trophy of the Quebec Major Junior Hockey League.

Winners
List of winners of the CHL Defenceman of the Year Award.

See also
 List of Canadian Hockey League awards

References

External links
 CHL Awards – CHL

Canadian Hockey League trophies and awards